Nettleton Hill is a hamlet in the unparished area of Huddersfield, in the Kirklees district in the English county of West Yorkshire. It is situated near the town of Huddersfield, north of Scapegoat Hill and south of Pighill Wood. Longwood reservoir is to the east of the settlement. Nettleton Hill is part of the Golcar ward and of the HD7 postcode district.

The Colne Valley Trail passes through Nettleton Hill.

See also
Listed buildings in Colne Valley (eastern area)

References

Hamlets in West Yorkshire
Geography of Huddersfield